Kirsti Huke (born March 6, 1977 in Melhus, Norway) is a Norwegian singer, and composer. Huke was best recognized as the lead singer for Norwegian doom metal/experimental band The 3rd and the Mortal in the final line-up.

She is also known from collaborations with musicians such as Egil Kapstad, Erlend Skomsvoll, Tore Brunborg, Ola Kvernberg, Vigleik Storaas, Håvard Wiik, Håkon Mjåset Johansen, Erik Nylander and Steinar Raknes.

She is the younger sister of the author Marte Huke.

Career
Huke was educated at the Heimdal Upper Secondary School between 1993 and 1996, and pursued the Jazz program at Norwegian University of Science and Technology from 1996 to 2001; in 2016, she was employed there as an assistant professor. Her own Kirsti Huke Quartet (established in 1998) also included Håvard Wiik (piano), Håkon Mjåset Johansen (drums) and Steinar Raknes (bass). In 2002, Wiik and Johansen were replaced by Vigleik Storaas (piano) and Erik Nylander (drums).

The K.H. Quartet has performed at jazz festivals such as Nattjazz in 2006. They released the album Deloo in 2007, followed up by Kirsti Huke in 2009. She has also been associated with the Trondheim Symphony Orchestra and Egil Kapstad Quartet at the Trondheim Jazz Festival in 2001, which was arranged by Erlend Skomsvoll and featured Håkon Mjåset Johansen on the double bass.

In 2006 Huke started as the lead singer of the indie pop rock band "-phy" (initiated in 1997) along with guitarist Petter Vågan, drummer Vigdis Sjelmo and bassist Ellen Ersfjord. The band launched the album Tree House in 2011.

Huke has toured with Trondheim Voices, and contributed to the "Grand Telemark" with Wetle Holte and Espen Gundersen, The 3rd and the Mortal, Tom Steinar Lund, and Per Borten's band Moving Oos with Siri Gjære. The last band released the album Peace & Love in 2007.

Discography
 As band leader
 2007: Deloo – (Grappa Music)
 2009: Kirsti Huke – (Fairplay Records)
 2015: Rags & Silks (Name Music & Publishing), with Ola Kvernberg and Erik Nylander

Collaborations 
 2001: Love Seriously Damages Health (Bergland Prod.), with Siri Gjære
 2002: Memoirs (Voices Music & Entertainment), with The 3rd and the Mortal
 2006: Survival Kit (Bergland Prod.), with Siri Gjære
 2007: Peace & Love – (Kong Tiki/Playground Records), with Moving Oos
 2008: Grand Telemark – (Sonne Disk), with Grand Telemark
 2009: The Wonder – (Sonne Disk), with Grand Telemark
 2010: Improvoicing (MNJ Records), with Trondheim Voices
 2011: Scent Of Soil – (Hubro), with Tore Brunborg, Petter Vågan, Rune Nergaard & Gard Nilssen
 2011: Tree House – (Crispin Glover Records), with "-phy"
 2013: Vi Vil Ut På Byen! (Øra Fonogram), with Tullkattesnutene

Other appearances 
 2007: Ingen Andre (MBN Records), with Ulf Risnes
 2007: City of Glass (Voices Of Wonder Records), with The Soundbyte/Paul Irgens
 2008: Katalysator (EMI Records), with Åge Aleksandersen
 2008: Sinecure (Crispin Glover Records), with Bitch Cassidy
 2009: New Violators (Fairplay Entertainment), with New Violators
 2009: Åge-boks 2 (Odeon Records), with Åge Aleksandersen
 2009: The Roaring Silence (Sandforest Records), with V Before U
 2010: Doppelgängers (Aftermath Music), with Goat The Head
 2010: While We Wait (The Record), with The Project
 2011: Migrations (MNJ records), with Trondheim Jazz Orchestra & Øyvind Brække
 2011: Scent Of Soil (List of Hubro albums|Hubro Music), with Scent Of Soil
 2012: Small Town (Columbia, Sony Music Norway), with Hans Bollandsås
 2012: Hurricane (Sonne Disk), with Wetle Holte
 2013: Sidewalk Comedy (MNJ records), with Trondheim Jazz Orchestra & Eirik Hegdal
 2014: Yesterday Song (MusikkLosen), with Terje Bjørklund
 2014: Vokal (NorCD), with Elin Rosseland
 2015: Texum (2015), with Texum

References

External links
 
 -phy Official Website
 Kirsti Huke & Stian Carstensen – A Nightingale Sang in Berkeley Square (JazzLAB) on YouTube

Norwegian women jazz singers
Norwegian jazz composers
Hubro Music artists
Grappa Music artists
Norwegian University of Science and Technology alumni
1977 births
Living people
Musicians from Melhus
20th-century Norwegian women singers
20th-century Norwegian singers
21st-century Norwegian women singers
21st-century Norwegian singers
Trondheim Voices members
The 3rd and the Mortal members